The Quartz Scraper Site, designated 36.29 by the Maine Archaeological Survey, is a prehistoric archaeological site in the Keens Mills area of Turner, Maine.  The site has yielded evidence of human habitation, including contact-period ceramic fragments and European trade beads.

The site was listed on the National Register of Historic Places in 1992.

See also
National Register of Historic Places listings in Androscoggin County, Maine

References

Archaeological sites on the National Register of Historic Places in Maine
Geography of Androscoggin County, Maine
Turner, Maine
National Register of Historic Places in Androscoggin County, Maine